The Pascagoula map turtle (Graptemys gibbonsi) is a species of turtle in the family Emydidae. The species is endemic to the southern United States.

Geographic range
The Pascagoula map turtle is restricted to the Pascagoula River in the United States. It formerly included a population in the Pearl River, but in 2010, that population was described as a separate species, the Pearl River map turtle, Graptemys pearlensis. The Pascagoula map turtle shares its range with the yellow-blotched map turtle, G. flavimaculata.

Etymology
The specific name, gibbonsi, is in honor of American herpetologist "Whit" Gibbons.

References

Further reading
Tortoise and Freshwater Turtle Specialist Group (1996).   Graptemys gibbonsi.   2006 IUCN Red List of Threatened Species.   Retrieved 29 July 2007.
Lovich JE, McCoy CJ (1992). "Review of the Graptemys pulchra Group (Reptilia: Testudines: Emydidae), with Descriptions of Two New Species". Annals of Carnegie Museum 61 (4): 293–315. ("Graptemys gibbonsi, new species", pp. 302–304, Figures 6–7).

Reptiles of the United States
Graptemys
Reptiles described in 1992
Taxonomy articles created by Polbot